The British Nutrition Foundation is a British registered charity. They are working towards creating a future where everyone has a healthy, sustainable diet by:

 Educating people
 Changing the Food Environment
 Advocating Science and Building Consensus

Operations
The British Nutrition Foundation's activities include:

 Developing high quality nutrition resources, information and training for a range of audiences
 Disseminating resources, information and training to make healthier choices easier
 Drummond Awards - championing nutrition science, advocating evidence-based nutrition science through recognising and rewarding excellence, and engagement, collaboration and partnerships that seek to improve public health
 Providing advice and consultancy on nutrition matters, such as devising, developing, and/or disseminating reviews of the evidence base; holding roundtables on specific topics; nutritional and dietary analyses; writing and editing; multi-media resource development; establishing nutrient criteria for product ranges; a sounding board for policy development; NDNS analysis; reviewing nutrition messages on websites; developing factsheets, FAQs, blogs and newsletters; and horizon scanning
 Engaging with the media, as well as social media
 Delivering high quality training and events, through conferences, workshops, webinars or modular online support (including schools)
 Publishing Nutrition Bulletin, British Nutrition Foundation's international, peer reviewed journal
 Providing www.nutrition.org.uk - a source of evidence-based nutrition information
 Advancing food and nutrition education in schools via Food - a fact of life 
 Hosting the British Nutrition Foundation Healthy Eating Week.

References

External links
 
 Food - a fact of life
 Nutrition Bulletin journal homepage
 British Nutrition Foundation at Spinprofiles.org

Video clips
 British Nutrition Foundation YouTube channel

Educational charities based in the United Kingdom
Food policy in the United Kingdom
Food science institutes
Health charities in the United Kingdom
Health education in the United Kingdom
Health education organizations
Nutrition organizations
Organizations established in 1967